In enzymology, a trans-1,2-dihydrobenzene-1,2-diol dehydrogenase is an enzyme that catalyzes the chemical reaction

trans-1,2-dihydrobenzene-1,2-diol + NADP+  catechol + NADPH + H+

Thus, the two substrates of this enzyme are trans-1,2-dihydrobenzene-1,2-diol and NADP+, whereas its three products are catechol, NADPH, and H+.

This enzyme belongs to the family of oxidoreductases, specifically those acting on the CH-CH group of donor with NAD+ or NADP+ as acceptor.  The systematic name of this enzyme class is trans-1,2-dihydrobenzene-1,2-diol:NADP+ oxidoreductase. This enzyme is also called dihydrodiol dehydrogenase.  This enzyme participates in metabolism of xenobiotics by cytochrome p450.

Structural studies

References

 

EC 1.3.1
NADPH-dependent enzymes
Enzymes of known structure